Channa andrao is a species of snakehead, a fish of the family Channidae. Its range includes India in Asia. It is described in 2013 by Ralf Britz. The species name honours Andrew Rao.

References

andrao
Fish of Asia
Fish described in 2013